John Glenn Doyle (born May 5, 1990) is a former American football tight end. He played college football at Western Kentucky, and played in the National Football League (NFL) for the Indianapolis Colts for nine seasons.

Early life
At Cathedral High School, Doyle was All-State and earned Honorable Mention All-State honors. Doyle was a member of the football team that won the championship in 2006. In his senior year, he caught 21 passes for 400 yards and four touchdowns, and earned an Indianapolis Star Honorable Mention. In addition to football, Doyle played basketball, lettered in rugby and won a state title in 2008.

College career
Western Kentucky was the only Football Bowl Subdivision program to offer Doyle an athletic scholarship. During Doyle's freshman year in 2009, he started 10 games at tight end. Doyle finished  with 365 yards on 37 catches with one touchdown. After the season, Doyle was named to Phil Steele's National All-Freshman squad.

Doyle started seven games during as a sophomore. Even though he suffered a season-ending injury, he still caught 20 passes for 224 yards and two touchdowns. During his junior year, Doyle started all 12 games, had 52 receptions for 614 receiving yards, and was named second-team All-Sun Belt.

Doyle, as a senior, had his best season. He started all 13 games, and caught a total of 53 passes for 566 yards and five touchdowns. Because of the stellar season, Doyle was named first-team All-Sun Belt. He was also a semifinalist for the Mackey Award.

During his time at Western Kentucky, Doyle was a three-time captain.

Collegiate statistics

Professional career

On January 26, 2013, Doyle played in the 2013 Senior Bowl as part of the Oakland Raiders' head coach Dennis Allen's North team that lost 21–16 to Detroit Lions' head coach Jim Schwartz' South team. He did not receive an invitation to participate at the NFL Scouting Combine. On February 21, 2013, Doyle held a private pro day and had scouts and team representatives from 20 NFL teams attend. He ran the majority of combine and positional drills, but elected to skip the bench press. Doyle was mentored by former Indianapolis Colts' tight end Ken Dilger in preparation for his pro day. At the conclusion of the pre-draft process, Doyle was projected to be a seventh round pick or priority undrafted free agent by NFL draft experts and scouts. He was ranked as the 20th best tight end prospect in the draft by DraftScout.com. Doyle went undrafted in the 2013 NFL Draft.

Tennessee Titans

2013
On May 1, 2013, the Tennessee Titans signed Doyle to a three-year, $1.49 million contract as an undrafted free agent. Throughout training camp, Doyle competed to be a backup tight end against Taylor Thompson, Brandon Barden, and Martell Webb. On August 31, 2013, the Tennessee Titans waived Doyle as part as their final roster cuts, but planned to sign him to their practice squad after clearing waivers.

Indianapolis Colts

2013
On September 1, 2013, the Indianapolis Colts claimed Doyle off of waivers and added him to their active roster. Head coach Chuck Pagano named Doyle the fourth tight end on the Colts' depth chart to begin the regular season, behind Dwayne Allen, Coby Fleener, and Dominique Jones.

He made his professional regular season debut in the Indianapolis Colts' 24–20 loss to the Miami Dolphins in Week after Dwayne Allen was placed on injured reserve due to a hip injury he sustained in the season-opener. On October 20, 2013, Doyle caught his first career reception on a seven-yard pass by quarterback Andrew Luck before being tackled by Danny Trevathan during the third quarter of a 39–33 win against the Denver Broncos in Week 7. The following game, he was promoted to being the primary backup on the depth chart behind Coby Fleener and earned his first career start during a 27–25 win at the Houston Texans in Week 9 after the Colts released Dominique Jones. He finished his rookie season in 2013 with five receptions for 19-yards in 15 games and four starts.

The Indianapolis Colts finished the 2013 season first in the AFC South with an 11–5 record. On January 4, 2014, Doyle appeared in his first career playoff game as the Colts defeated the Kansas City Chiefs 45–44 in the AFC Wildcard Game. On January 11, 2014, Doyle started in his first career playoff game and caught one pass for seven-yards during a 43–22 loss at the New England Patriots in the AFC Divisional Round.

2014
During training camp, Doyle competed for a roster spot as a backup tight end against Weslye Saunders and Erik Swoope. Head coach Chuck Pagano named Doyle the third tight end on the Colts' depth chart to begin the regular season, behind Dwayne Allen and Coby Fleener.

On September 15, 2014, Doyle caught two passes for 12-yards and scored his first touchdown during a 30–27 loss to the Philadelphia Eagles in Week 2. Doyle caught a two-yard touchdown pass by quarterback Andrew Luck in the second quarter which also marked Luck's 50th career touchdown pass. In Week 17, he caught a season-high four receptions for 21-yards and a touchdown during the Colts' 27–10 victory at the Tennessee Titans. Doyle finished the 2014 season with 18 receptions for 118 receiving yards, and two touchdowns in 16 games and one start. Doyle played 399 offensive snaps (34.5%) and was mainly used as a blocker in Pep Hamilton's offense. The Indianapolis Colts finished first in the AFC South with an 11–5 record and reached the AFC Championship Game before being defeated 45–7 by the New England Patriots.

2015
Head coach Chuck Pagano named Doyle the third tight end on the depth chart to begin the regular season, behind Dwayne Allen and Coby Fleener.

On September 27, 2015, Doyle recorded a season-high three receptions for 32-yards during a 35–33 victory at the Tennessee Titans in Week 3. On November 8, 2015, Doyle had two catches for 18-yards and a touchdown during a 27–24 victory against the Denver Broncos in Week 9. He recorded a three-yard touchdown reception that also marked quarterback Andrew Luck's 100th career touchdown pass. On November 23, 2015, the Indianapolis Colts fired offensive coordinator Pep Hamilton and promoted associate head coach Rob Chudzinski to offensive coordinator for the rest of the season. He finished his third season in 2015 with 12 receptions for 72 receiving yards and a touchdown in 16 games and two starts.

2016
On March 3, 2016, the Indianapolis Colts extended a qualifying offer to Doyle as a restricted free agent. On April 24, 2016, Doyle accepted his one-year, $1.67 million restricted free agent tender after he did not receive any control offers from any other team. Doyle entered training camp slated as the secondary starting tight end on the depth chart after Coby Fleener departed during free agency. Head coach Chuck Pagano officially named Doyle and Dwayne Allen the starting tight ends to begin the regular season.

He started in the Indianapolis Colts' season-opener against the Detroit Lions and caught three passes for 35-yards and two touchdowns in their 39–35 loss. It became Doyle's first multi-touchdown game of his career. On October 23, 2016, he caught a season-high nine passes for 78-yards and a touchdown in the Colts' 34–26 victory at the Tennessee Titans in Week 7. Doyle completed the 2016 season with 59 receptions for 584 receiving yards and five touchdowns in 16 games and 14 starts.

2017

On March 7, 2017, the Indianapolis Colts signed Doyle to a three-year, $18.90 million contract with $7.50 million guaranteed.

Doyle entered training camp slated as the No. 1 starting tight end on the depth chart after the Colts traded Dwayne Allen to the New England Patriots. Head coach Chuck Pagano named Doyle the starting tight end to begin the regular season in 2017. In Week 4, Doyle caught five passes for 27 receiving yards before exiting in the third quarter of a 46–18 loss at the Seattle Seahawks due to a concussion. He was inactive for the Colts' Week 5 victory against the San Francisco 49ers due to neck soreness. On October 29, 2017, Doyle caught a career-high 12 receptions for 121-yards and a touchdown in the Colts' 24–23 loss at the Cincinnati Bengals. On December 31, 2017, the Indianapolis Colts fired head coach Chuck Pagano and his coaching staff after they finished with a 4–12 record in 2017.
Doyle finished the 2017 season with a career-high 80 receptions for 690 receiving yards and four touchdowns in 15 games and 15 starts.

On January 21, 2018, it was announced that Doyle was selected to play in the 2018 Pro Bowl as a replacement for New England Patriots' tight end Rob Gronkowski who was set to appear in Super Bowl LII. Doyle became the first Western Kentucky alumni to be selected to the Pro Bowl in school history.

2018

In 2018, Doyle played in six games, missing five games with a hip injury, before being hospitalized following the Week 12 game with a kidney injury. He was placed on injured reserve on November 26, 2018.

2019
On December 6, 2019, Doyle signed a three-year, $21 million contract extension with the Colts through the 2022 season. In 2019, he started all 16 games and finished with 43 receptions for 448 yards and four touchdowns. After the season, Doyle was named to the 2020 Pro Bowl as a replacement for Travis Kelce, who was appearing in Super Bowl LIV.

2021
On October 10, 2021 during a week 5 game against the Ravens, Doyle drew a personal foul penalty against Tavon Young in the final minute of the game when he pushed Young's head into the ground after a play, then fell when Young pushed him back. This penalty allowed the Colts to turn a 3rd and 18 into an opportunity for a 47 yard field goal to win the game. However, Colts kicker Rodrigo Blankenship would miss the kick and the Colts would go on to lose in overtime.

On March 7, 2022, Doyle announced his retirement from the NFL.

NFL career statistics

Regular season

Postseason

References

External links

 
 Indianapolis Colts bio

1990 births
Living people
American football tight ends
Western Kentucky Hilltoppers football players
Tennessee Titans players
Indianapolis Colts players
Players of American football from Indianapolis
American Conference Pro Bowl players
Ed Block Courage Award recipients